Shinnaphat Leeaoh (born 2 February 1997) is a Thai professional footballer who plays as a centre back, he has also been used as a right back for Thai League 1 club Chiangrai United and the Thailand national team.

International career
In March 2018 he was in the squad of Thailand for 2018 King's Cup, but did not make an appearance.

International goals

U23

Honours

International
Thailand U-23
 Sea Games  Gold Medal (1); 2017
 Dubai Cup (1) :  2017
Thailand U-21
 Nations Cup (1): 2016

Club
Chiangrai United
 Thai League 1 (1): 2019
 Thai FA Cup (3): 2017, 2018, 2020–21
 Thailand Champions Cup (2): 2018, 2020
 Thai League Cup (1): 2018

External links
 
 

1997 births
Living people
Shinnaphat Leeaoh
Association football central defenders
Shinnaphat Leeaoh
Shinnaphat Leeaoh
Shinnaphat Leeaoh
Shinnaphat Leeaoh
Shinnaphat Leeaoh
Shinnaphat Leeaoh
Shinnaphat Leeaoh
Shinnaphat Leeaoh
Southeast Asian Games medalists in football
Footballers at the 2018 Asian Games
Competitors at the 2017 Southeast Asian Games
Shinnaphat Leeaoh
Competitors at the 2019 Southeast Asian Games
Shinnaphat Leeaoh
Shinnaphat Leeaoh